Grimfist is a Norwegian blackened death metal band from Oslo. Founded in October 2001, they are currently signed to Candlelight Records, with whom they have released two albums.

History
The band's debut album, Ghouls of Grandeur,  was recorded in Abyss Studios in Sweden, March 2003, and was mixed by Peter Tägtgren. The record was well received by the critics, who noted the band's unique mix of heavy metal, black metal and death metal. The collaboration was between guitarist Ole Walaunet (Deride), drummer Horgh (Immortal, Hypocrisy), and vocalist Frediablo (ex-Necrophagia, Gorelord, Hemnur).

Horgh left the band in 2004 ro concentrate on his duties as Hypocrisy's drummer. He was replaced by Christian Svendsen (aka "Anti Christian") known from bands like Tsjuder and The Cumshots. Robin Eaglestone of Cradle of Filth handled live bass duties in the band for a little while in 2005/2006.

In 2005, Grimfist released their follow-up record, Ten Steps to Hell. The record was praised by critics, receiving a respectable 4/5 in Kerrang! magazine. Tours with Susperia and Red Harvest followed, gaining the band further admiration.

In September 2005, the band's vocalist Frediablo issued a statement saying he was quitting all of his musical projects and bands, except for Grimfist. He eventually left Grimfist as well in August 2006, because he got tired of the music scene.

In August 2008, Frediablo re-joined Grimfist.

Band members

Current members
 Frediablo - vocals
 Ole Walaunet - guitar, bass
 Birger Larsen - bass
 Christian Svendsen (aka Anti Christian) - drums

Former members
 Tommy Hjelm - vocals
 Reidar Horghagen (aka Horgh) - drums
 Robin Eaglestone - bass
 Dreggen - bass
 Ares -  bass (live only)
 Dustin Perle - drums

Discography
 Ghouls of Grandeur - Candlelight Records (2003)
 Ten Steps to Hell - Candlelight Records (2005)

References

External links

Norwegian black metal musical groups
Musical groups established in 2001
2001 establishments in Norway
Musical quartets
Musical groups from Oslo
Candlelight Records artists